Top Country Albums is a chart that ranks the top-performing country music albums in the United States, published by Billboard.  In 1967, 17 different albums topped the chart based on sales reports submitted by a representative sample of stores nationwide.  The chart was published under the banner Hot Country Albums in the issue of Billboard dated January 6 but the title changed to Top Country LP's the following week.

In the issue of Billboard dated January 6, Eddy Arnold was at number one with the album Turn the World Around, the record's third week in the top spot.  It remained at number one for the first five weeks of 1968 before it was displaced from the top spot in the issue dated February 10 by By the Time I Get to Phoenix by Glen Campbell, which spent four weeks atop the chart.  It was the first chart-topping album for Campbell, who had previously worked largely as a session musician, but it marked the start of an unbroken run of number ones in quick succession.  In June he returned to number one with Hey Little One, and two months later was back at the top of the listing with A New Place in the Sun, which spent six weeks at number one, the longest unbroken run atop the chart during 1968.  Four weeks after that album was displaced from the top spot, Campbell returned to number one with Gentle on My Mind, which had first entered the chart in October of the previous year and finally reached the top spot more than a year later.  Two weeks later the album was replaced at number one by Bobbie Gentry and Glen Campbell, a collaborative album with Bobbie Gentry.  In the issue of Billboard dated November 30 Campbell achieved his sixth number-one album of 1968 with Wichita Lineman, which occupied the top spot for the final five weeks of the year.  His total of 19 weeks at number one was the most by any artist, more than twice that achieved by any other act.

Two members of the Country Music Hall of Fame topped the albums chart for the final time in 1968.  Buck Owens, one of the most successful country singers of the mid-1960s, had achieved twelve chart-topping albums in slightly over four years since the listing was first published, but It Takes People Like You to Make People Like Me would be his last release to reach the top of the chart.  The album was twice displaced from the number-one position by The Everlovin' World of Eddy Arnold, which would prove to be the final chart-topper for Eddy Arnold, who had experienced considerable success in the late 1940s and early 1950s and then revived his career in the mid-1960s by embracing the "Nashville sound", a newer style of country music which eschewed elements of the earlier honky-tonk style in favour of smooth productions which had a broader appeal,  A third Hall of Famer, Tammy Wynette, reached the top of the chart for the first time with D-I-V-O-R-C-E.  Although only three of her nearly 50 charting albums went all the way to number one, her lengthy and successful career led to her being dubbed the "first lady of country".

Chart history

References

1968-related lists
1968
1968 record charts